The Cotai Strip is a term coined by Las Vegas Sands Corporation regarding its building of a strip of hotel-casinos in the Cotai section of Macau, a special administrative region of the People's Republic of China.

Cotai was the result of a major land reclamation project which joined the two islands of Coloane and Taipa and is part of the Macau government's continuous efforts to expand the region's territory. The reclaimed land in Cotai is to be mainly used for casino developments and Las Vegas Sands Corporation envisioned that their development of several adjacent properties would comprise an area that would resemble the Las Vegas Strip, albeit on a considerably smaller scale.

Over the past decade, the layout of the Cotai Strip has also slowly developed into a grid-like layout with major hotels and casinos such as Galaxy Macau, MGM Cotai, and Wynn Palace, not directly connected to the 'strip' as opposed to Las Vegas Strip with the majority of major hotels and casinos with front access to the strip.

Naming
The United States Patent and Trademark Office has granted Las Vegas Sands Corporation a trademark on the term "Cotai Strip" (Serial #78588080, Registration #4396486), however, some members of the press use the term to refer to all of the hotel-casinos in Cotai.

History

Creation

The Cotai Strip is a term coined by American Las Vegas Sands Corporation about its building of a strip of hotel-casinos in the Cotai section of Macau, a special administrative region of the People's Republic of China.

Galaxy Entertainment Group's Grand Waldo Hotel was the first casino to commence operations in Cotai, opening its doors in May 2006. The construction of many other casino and hotel projects is currently underway. The largest and most notable property on Cotai so far is Las Vegas Sands' The Venetian Macao, which opened its doors on August 28, 2007. Melco Resorts & Entertainment Limited opened the City of Dreams directly across the street from The Venetian Macao on June 1, 2009.

Economic Crisis (2008-2010)

Due to the 2008 financial crisis, up to 11,000 construction workers were to lose their jobs as US gaming giant Las Vegas Sands cuts back its development in Macau. Stephen Weaver, Sands' president for Asia, said up to 11,000 workers will lose their jobs in Macau after the company halted building projects in the city such as the developments of Plots 5 and 6, previously Sands Cotai Central, now The Londoner Macao, on the strip. Las Vegas Sands had instead, focused its construction work on the Marina Bay Sands Resort in Singapore.

On 30 November 2009, Las Vegas Sands announced that it had secured $1.75 billion to complete its development of Sands Cotai Central, which was abandoned with 65% completed in mid-2008. Sands Cotai Central was completed in phases from 2012 to 2015 before being rebranded to The Londoner Macao in 2021.

No information was released about Plots 3, 7 and 8. These were very likely to be cancelled. Macao's Director of the Lands, Public Works and Transport Bureau (DSSOPT), Jaime Carion, said on 5 December 2010, that the Government is now looking at developing non-gaming projects in Cotai. He stressed that the Sands China application procedure for Plots 7 and 8 was not fully complete and that the Government would announce the result at the most convenient time.

Galaxy Entertainment Group who was building Galaxy Macau had also stated that after having a very slow construction in 2009, it will try to get its first phase of development open in the first quarter of 2011. Phase 1 of the Galaxy Macau was eventually opened on 15 May 2011, followed by Phase 2 on 27 May 2015.

Recent Developments
The Plaza Macao, housing the Four Seasons Macao, opened a 40-story all-suite tower in October 2020. The tower, associated with the Four Seasons Macao, is branded as the Grand Suites at Four Seasons, comprising 289 suites. Sands Cotai Central was officially rebranded to The Londoner Macao when its first phase of rebranding works was completed on 8 February 2021. As of August 2021, several new hotel-casinos have opened in Cotai, with several more scheduled to fully open in the next few years including the Grand Lisboa Palace and the Lisboeta Macau.

Transportation

Bus 
Other than a number of public bus services serving the area, many of the hotels in Cotai provides free shuttle buses for guests and visitors. These shuttle buses ferry passengers from the Border Gate, Macau International Airport, Outer Harbour Ferry Terminal, and Taipa Ferry Terminal, to the hotels, and vice versa.

Macau Light Rapid Transit 

Opened on 10 December 2019, the Taipa section of the Macau Light Rapid Transit serves the Cotai Strip and the larger area of Cotai. The line has stations at nearly every hotel-casino as it meanders through the peripheral road of the Cotai Strip.

Stations serving adjacent hotel-casinos are as follow:

 Pai Kok Station - Galaxy Macau
 Cotai West Station - Galaxy Macau, Cotai Arena, Cotai Expo, The Venetian Macao, The Plaza Macao, The Parisian Macao, The Londoner Macao
 Lotus Checkpoint Station - Studio City Macau
 Cotai East Station - MGM Cotai, City of Dreams, Wynn Palace, The Londoner Macao

Map of Casinos and Hotels in Cotai by Macau Concessionaires

Current Properties

Future Properties

Galaxy Macau Expansion Phases 3 and 4

Galaxy International Convention Centre (Phase 3) 
Scheduled to be completed in the second half of 2021, Galaxy Macau will see the addition of a large-scale 16,000-seat arena named Galaxy Arena, a 650-seat auditorium, 40,000 square metres of MICE space, including a 10,000-square metre pillarless exhibition hall, and a 700-room hotel tower to be operated by Andaz as part of its Phase 3 expansion - Galaxy International Convention Centre (GICC). Built adjacent to Macau Light Rapid Transit's Cotai West Station, GICC will be seamlessly integrated with the existing Galaxy Macau resort.

Raffles at Galaxy Macau (Phase 3) 
Announced on 1 March 2021, Galaxy Macau will be adding the Raffles brand to its hotel portfolio as part of its Phase 3 expansion. To be housed in an all-new exclusive all-suites tower, the 450-room Raffles at Galaxy Macau will feature a glass airbridge connecting the two towers on every floor, a Mediterranean-inspired garden, an infinity edge pool, a luxury spa, and a fine dining restaurant. The hotel is scheduled to open in the second half of 2021.

Phase 4 
Scheduled to be completed in 2022, Phase 4 of Galaxy Macau's expansion will primarily be non-gaming focused and will add approximately 2,000 hotel rooms to the resort.

Studio City Macau Expansion Phase 2 

Scheduled to be completed by mid-2022, Phase 2 expansion of Studio City Macau will include two new hotel towers with a total of approximately 900 rooms. Additional gaming space, a cineplex, an indoor water park touted to be one of the world's largest, and facilities for meetings and exhibitions are also part of the expansion plans.

Under the terms of its land concession with the Macau SAR Government, Studio City Macau must complete its expansion by 31 May 2022. However, due to the COVID-19 pandemic, construction is likely to be delayed and Melco Resorts & Entertainment Limited has stated that the expansion is unlikely to be completed by the deadline.

Wynn Palace Expansion Phases 1 and 2 

Announced by Wynn Resorts Limited in 2019, the expansion of Wynn Palace will focus on adding non-gaming assets and two new hotel towers with a total of approximately 1,300 rooms.

Phase 1 
A large glass and steel structure, named the Crystal Pavilion, housing an immersive performance space will be built adjacent to the existing Wynn Palace. Furthermore, a 650-room hotel tower will be erected alongside. Non-gaming assets such as interactive sculptures, gardens, and a gourmet food pavilion are also part of the expansion plans.

Phase 1 is estimated to cost US$2 billion, with construction expected to begin in 2021 and completed by 2024.

Phase 2 
Another hotel tower housing 650 rooms will be built as part of Phase 2. Further details on this phase have yet to be released.

MGM Cotai Expansion Phase 2 

First mentioned by MGM China Holdings Limited in 2018, a few months after the inauguration of MGM Cotai, an all-new additional south hotel tower of approximately 900 rooms and 100 suites has been planned as part of MGM Cotai's expansion plans. The existing retail podium will also be expanded to allow for more restaurants, retail outlets, and entertainment spots. The foundations for the expansion have already been built when constructing the MGM Cotai previously.

In 2019, the chief executive of MGM China Holdings Limited, Grant Bowie, announced that the expansion will only be likely from 2021 or beyond.

Redevelopment of City of Dreams 

Announced by Melco Resorts & Entertainment Limited in 2019, City of Dreams will undergo a makeover with a revamp of its hotel properties.

With renovation works begun, Nüwa Hotel will be extensively refurbished after being renamed and rebranded from the former Crown Towers.

In addition, three new villas will be added to the Morpheus Hotel.

The Countdown Hotel, formerly Hard Rock Hotel, will also be revamped and renamed Libertine.

Works for these redevelopments are scheduled to be completed in 2021.

Theme Park and Resort
The Macau Theme Park and Resort Ltd, controlled by Angela Leong On Kei, has said that it intends to build a MOP 10.4 billion family-oriented amusement resort and hotels in Cotai. According to a press statement, the integrated resort project will be developed in three phases and each of them will take about two and a half to three years to complete. 
The company revealed that the entire family resort will consist of one 5-star, four 4-star and one 3-star hotels with over 6,000 guest rooms, shopping malls, convention facilities, an indoor beach and wave pool, amusement rides, a 4D theatre, an equestrian centre, a horse carriage trail as well as a water sports performance centre.

SJM Holdings is in talks with Macau Theme Park and Resort Ltd to try to find a way for both companies to cooperate on Cotai, chief executive officer, Ambrose So Shu Fai, revealed on 16 December 2010. Stanley Ho's SJM is still waiting for the Government to approve the application for a plot in Cotai, which sits just beside the Macau Dome and the land where the company, headed by businesswoman and lawmaker Angela Leong On Kei – who is also Stanley Ho's fourth wife and SJM's director –, is set to build the theme park. "We are not a shareholder in the theme park development, but we did talk with Angela Leong, who is developing that theme park, to see if there is a synergy between the two plots of land," So told reporters.

As of 2021, a portion of the land has been developed as Lisboeta Macau, a Macau-themed integrated resort, by Macau Theme Park and Resort Ltd.

The Jumeirah Macau Hotel
First announced in 2008 by Shun Tak Group, Dubai-based Jumeirah Group will manage and operate Macau's first ultra luxury hotel. The Jumeirah Macau Hotel is a 250-room five-star hotel to be located across from the Macau East Asian Games Dome. Initially scheduled to be opened in 2013, the site remains unused and there have been no further information on the project as of date.

Plots 7 and 8
Sands China's application for Cotai plots 7 and 8 was submitted after a freeze on gaming land concession was announced back in 2008, secretary for Economy and Finance, Francis Tam Pak Yuen, explained on 15 December 2010 on the sidelines of a meeting at the Legislative Assembly. On the other hand, the three gaming operators Wynn Macau, MGM Macau and SJM Holdings who are yet to be granted plots in Cotai have filed applications before that policy was stated. As such it is likely the land concession requests of will be approved, the secretary said. But the Land, Public Works and Transport Bureau (DSSOPT) director Jaime Carion told local media on Thursday 16 December 2010 that the plots 7 and 8 in Cotai will not be granted to either gaming operators SJM Holdings or Sands China. After the Government snub, Las Vegas Sands (LVS) has dropped its interest in developing plots 7 and 8 in Cotai. "If somebody else builds on [parcels] 7 and 8, I will be happy. Happier than if I were going to build on it," LVS chairman Sheldon Adelson said at the Bank of America Merrill Lynch Global Gaming Conference in Las Vegas, on 9 January 2011.

See also
Gambling in Macau

References

External links

Concelho das Ilhas
Tourism in Macau
Cotai